Per Anders Åberg (16 April 1945 – 23 January 2018) was a Swedish sculptor, painter and cartoonist. Åberg was best known for his wooden models of all sorts of buildings. In the early 1970s, he was assigned to decorate the Stockholm metro station Solna Centrum. In 1980, Åberg founded the Mannaminne museum, an outdoor art museum in Nordingrå, Sweden.

References

1945 births
2018 deaths
Museum founders
Artists from Stockholm
20th-century Swedish sculptors
20th-century philanthropists